The 1987 NHL Entry Draft was the 25th NHL Entry Draft. It was held at Joe Louis Arena in Detroit, Michigan, and was the first draft held in the United States. The National Hockey League (NHL) teams selected 252 players eligible for entry into professional ranks, in the reverse order of the 1986–87 NHL season and playoff standings. This is the list of those players selected.

The last active player in the NHL from this draft class was Mathieu Schneider, who retired after the 2009–10 season.

Selections by round
Below are listed the selections in the 1987 NHL Entry Draft. Club teams are located in North America unless otherwise noted.

Round one

 The Vancouver Canucks' first-round pick went to the Boston Bruins as the result of a trade on June 6, 1986 that sent Barry Pederson to Vancouver in exchange for Cam Neely and this pick.

Round two

 The Minnesota North Stars' second-round pick went to the Calgary Flames as the result of a trade on June 15, 1985 that sent Kent Nilsson and an optional third-round picks in 1986 NHL Entry Draft or 1987 NHL Entry Draft to Calgary in exchange for Minnesota' second-round pick in 1985 NHL Entry Draft and this pick.
 The Quebec Nordiques' second-round pick went to the Philadelphia Flyers as the result of a trade on June 21, 1986 that sent Philadelphia's second-round pick in 1986 NHL Entry Draft to Quebec in exchange for this pick.
 The Boston Bruins' third-round pick went to the Minnesota North Stars as the result of a trade on May 16, 1986 that sent Tom McCarthy to Boston in exchange for Boston's third-round pick in 1986 NHL Entry Draft and this pick.

Round three

 The Buffalo Sabres' third-round pick went to the Los Angeles Kings as the result of a trade on April 22, 1986 that sent Los Angeles' eighth-round pick in 1987 NHL Entry Draft and future considerations to Buffalo in exchange for this pick.
 The Minnesota North Stars' third-round pick went to the New York Rangers as the result of a trade on September 8, 1986 that sent Brian MacLellan to Minnesota in exchange for this pick (being conditional at the time of the trade). The condition – the Rangers receives a 3rd-rd pick if MacLellan scores 25 or more goals in the 1986-87 season or a 4th-rd pick if less than 25 goals - was converted on March 3, 1987 scoring his 25th goal of the season.
 The New York Rangers' third-round pick went to the Detroit Red Wings as the result of a trade on July 29, 1986 that sent Kelly Kisio, Lane Lambert, Jim Leavins and Detroit's fifth-round pick in 1988 NHL Entry Draft to the Rangers in exchange for Glen Hanlon, the Rangers' third-round pick in 1988 NHL Entry Draft and this pick.
 The New Jersey Devils' third-round pick went to the Buffalo Sabres as the result of a trade on June 13, 1987 that sent Tom Kurvers to New Jersey in exchange for New Jersey's tenth-round pick in 1989 NHL Entry Draft and this pick.
 New Jersey previously acquired this pick as the result of a trade with the Detroit Red Wings on March 9, 1987 that sent that sent Mel Bridgman to Detroit in exchange for Chris Cichocki and this pick.
 The Winnipeg Jets' third-round pick went to the Montreal Canadiens as the result of a trade on January 8, 1987 that sent Steve Rooney to Winnipeg in exchange for this pick.
 The Hartford Whalers' third-round pick went to the Chicago Black Hawks as the result of a trade on February 3, 1986 that sent Bill Gardner to Hartford in exchange for an optional third-round picks in 1986 NHL Entry Draft or 1987 NHL Entry Draft (this pick).

Round four

 The Buffalo Sabres' fourth-round pick went to the Edmonton Oilers as the result of a trade on March 6, 1987 that sent Lee Fogolin Jr., Mark Napier and Edmonton's fourth-round pick in 1987 NHL Entry Draft to Buffalo in exchange for Normand Lacombe, Wayne Van Dorp and this pick.
 The Minnesota North Stars' fourth-round pick went to the Boston Bruins as the result of a trade on March 10, 1987 that sent Paul Boutilier to Minnesota in exchange for this pick. 
 The Los Angeles Kings' fourth-round pick went to the New York Rangers as the result of a trade on December 9, 1985 that sent Grant Ledyard and Roland Melanson to Los Angeles in exchange for Brian MacLellan and this pick. 
 The Toronto Maple Leafs' fourth-round pick went to the Calgary Flames as the result of a trade on May 29, 1985 that sent Don Edwards to Toronto in exchange for future considerations.  These considerations became an optional second-round or fourth-round pick (this pick) in 1987 NHL Entry Draft.
 The New York Rangers' fourth-round pick went to the Minnesota North Stars as the result of a trade on December 9, 1985 that sent Roland Melanson to the Rangers in exchange for the Ranger's second-round pick in 1986 NHL Entry Draft and this pick.
 The Edmonton Oilers' fourth-round pick went to the Buffalo Sabres as the result of a trade on March 6, 1987 that sent Normand Lacombe, Wayne Van Dorp and Buffalo's fourth-round pick in 1987 NHL Entry Draft to Edmonton in exchange for Lee Fogolin Jr., Mark Napier and this pick.

Round five

 The Vancouver Canucks' fifth-round pick was re-acquired as the result of a trade on June 13, 1987 that sent Vancouver's fifth round pick (#92) in 1987 NHL Entry Draft to Philadelphia in exchange for this pick (#87).
 Philadelphia previously acquired this pick as the result of a trade on June 6, 1986 that sent Dave Richter, Rich Sutter and Philadelphia's third-round pick in 1986 NHL Entry Draft to Vancouver in exchange for Jean-Jacques Daigneault, Vancouver's second-round pick in 1986 NHL Entry Draft and this pick.

Round six

Round seven
Seventh round pick Tod Hartje would become the first North American trained player to play professional hockey in the Soviet Union.

Round eight

 The Los Angeles Kings' eighth-round pick went to the Buffalo Sabres as the result of a trade on April 22, 1986 that sent Buffalo's third-round pick in 1987 NHL Entry Draft to Los Angeles in exchange for future considerations and this pick.

Round nine

Round ten

 The Hartford Whalers' tenth-round pick went to the St. Louis Blues as the result of a trade on March 10, 1987 that sent Pat Hughes to Hartford in exchange for this pick.

Round eleven

Round twelve

Draftees based on nationality

See also
 1987 NHL Supplemental Draft
 1987–88 NHL season
 List of NHL players

References

External links
 1987 NHL Entry Draft player stats at The Internet Hockey Database

Draft
National Hockey League Entry Draft
Ice hockey in Detroit